Torda-Aranyos was an administrative county (comitatus) of the Kingdom of Hungary. Its territory is now in central Romania (central Transylvania). The capital of the county was Torda (present-day Turda).

Geography

Torda-Aranyos county shared borders with the Hungarian counties Arad, Bihar, Kolozs, Maros-Torda, Kis-Küküllő, Alsó-Fehér and Hunyad. The rivers Mureș and Arieș flowed through the county. Its area was 3,514 km2 around 1910.

History
Torda-Aranyos county was formed in 1876, when the western part of the Torda County and the Székely seat of Aranyosszék (plus small parts of Alsó-Fehér County) were united. In 1920, by the Treaty of Trianon, the county became part of Romania. Its territory lies in the present Romanian counties of Cluj (the north, including Turda), Alba (the south and west) and Mureș (the east).

Demographics

Subdivisions

In the early 20th century, the subdivisions of Torda-Aranyos county were:

See also
 Torda County

Notes

References

Kingdom of Hungary counties in Transylvania